Waterbury station, also known as Waterbury–Stowe, is an Amtrak train station in Waterbury, Vermont, United States. It was originally built in 1875 by the Central Vermont Railroad.

During 2006, the station underwent a major renovation project, during which the building was restored to its 1875 appearance. Corrective structural work was done on the trackside wall and canopy and water drainage problems were addressed. Workers also rebuilt the bell-shaped cupola on the top of the central tower. Inside, partitions were removed to expose the original 18-foot-high vaulted ceiling. Green Mountain Coffee now leases most of the space in the depot.

References

External links

Waterbury-Stowe Amtrak Station (USA Rail Guide -- Train Web)

Amtrak stations in Vermont
Buildings and structures in Waterbury, Vermont
Former Central Vermont Railway stations
Transportation buildings and structures in Washington County, Vermont
Railway stations in the United States opened in 1875